Joshua Francis Fisher (February 17, 1807 - January 21, 1873) was a United States author and philanthropist.

Biography
Born in Philadelphia, Joshua Fisher graduated in 1825 at Harvard College, and was admitted to the bar in Philadelphia in 1829, but did not practice. He became an incorporator of the Pennsylvania Institution for the Instruction of the Blind and studied questions of United States, in particular of Pennsylvanian, history. He married Elizabeth Powell Francis, who died during the birth of their only child, Joshua Francis Fisher, who was brought up by relatives. In 1833, Fisher was elected as a member of the American Philosophical Society.  During the American Civil War, he sympathized with the Confederacy.

Works
 The Private Life and Domestic Habits of William Penn (1836)
 The Degradation of Our Representative System and Its Reform (1863)
 Reform in Our Municipal Elections (a pamphlet, 1866)

References

 
 

1807 births
1873 deaths
Harvard College alumni
Historians from Pennsylvania
19th-century American writers
Writers from Philadelphia
Philanthropists from Pennsylvania
19th-century American philanthropists
American people of Indian descent
Burr family